The 2007 Speedway Grand Prix of Great Britain, known as the 2007 FIM Meridian Lifts British Speedway Grand Prix for sponsorship reasons, was the fifth race of the 2007 Speedway Grand Prix season. It took place on 30 June in the Millennium Stadium in Cardiff, United Kingdom.

Starting positions draw 
The Speedway Grand Prix Commission nominated David Howe (as Wild Card), Edward Kennett and Daniel King (both as Track Reserve).  This was undertaken at the suggestion of the British event organisers who requested that finishing positions from the 2007 British Championship determine the identity of the wild card and reserves - the highest placed rider in that event (other than the pre-qualified Chris Harris and Scott Nicholls) would be the wild card, the next two would be the track reserves.  David Howe finished second to Harris and took the wild card place.

(4) Andreas Jonsson (Sweden)
(6) Hans N. Andersen (Denmark)
(16) David Howe (UK)
(11) Scott Nicholls (UK)
(13) Wiesław Jaguś (Poland)
(8) Tomasz Gollob (Poland)
(14) Rune Holta (Poland)
(7) Matej Žagar (Slovenia)
(3) Nicki Pedersen (Denmark)
(1) Jason Crump (Australia)
(9) Jarosław Hampel (Poland)
(15) Chris Harris (UK)
(10) Antonio Lindbäck (Sweden)
(5) Leigh Adams (Australia)
(12) Bjarne Pedersen (Denmark)
(2) Greg Hancock (USA)
(17) Edward Kennett (UK)
(18) Daniel King (UK)

Heat details

The intermediate classification

See also 
 List of Speedway Grand Prix riders

References 

B
2007
Speedway Grand Prix of Great Britain 2007
Speedway Grand Prix
Speedway Grand Prix
2000s in Cardiff